The 1926 College Football All-Southern Team consists of American football players selected to the College Football All-Southern Teams selected by various organizations for the 1926 Southern Conference football season. Alabama won the SoCon and national championship.

Composite eleven

The All-Southern eleven compiled by the Associated Press included:
Red Barnes, quarterback for Alabama, professional baseball outfielder with  Washington Senators and the Chicago White Sox.
John Barnhill, tackle for Tennessee, later head coach at his alma mater.
Herschel Caldwell, end for Alabama, made the extra point to tie Stanford in the Rose Bowl. Caldwell was called by one source "one of the greatest defensive backs the South has produced in years." He later assisted coach Wallace Wade at Duke University.
Gordon Holmes, center for Alabama, got a case of appendicitis en route to the Rose Bowl while in El Paso, and was left there with the idea of Babe Pearce filling in for Holmes. Holmes let his doctors know he would catch the next train to Pasadena.
Curtis Luckey, tackle for Georgia, known in his time as one of the best linemen in the South.
Charles Mackall, guard and captain for Virginia, led the Southern Conference in field goals in 1926 with four. He won the Virginia state amateur golf championship in 1927.
George Morton, halfback for Georgia. In the rivalry game at Grant Field with Georgia Tech, Georgia found itself down 13 to 0 at the half. Herdis McCrary and Morton led a comeback, winning 14 to 13. Known as the best all-round athlete that Episcopal High School has ever produced. 
Fred Pickhard, guard for Alabama, blocked the punt against Sewanee, leading to the safety which secured the game and the undefeated season. Just 16 punts were blocked all year for scores in college football, and Pickhard had three of them. He was selected Most Valuable Player of the 1927 Rose Bowl in which Alabama tied Stanford. He then had a long career with the Goodyear Tire & Rubber Company in Portland, Oregon as a service manager.
Ty Rauber, fullback for Washington and Lee, third-team AP All-American. He was later a special agent with the FBI.
Bill Spears, quarterback for Vanderbilt, second-team AP All-American, inducted into the College Football Hall of Fame in 1962.
Hoyt Winslett, end for Alabama, first Southern player elected first-team AP All-American. He was recently shifted from the backfield to end, and was a renowned passer connecting many times with Caldwell.

Composite overview
Hoyt Winslett received the most votes, 37 of a possible 41.

All-Southerns of 1926

Ends
Hoyt Winslett, Alabama (C, UP-1, S, SWI)
Herschel Caldwell, Alabama (C, UP-2 [as hb])
Johnny Marshall, Georgia Tech (C, S, SWI)
Harry Gamble, Tulane (C, UP-1)
Larry Creson, Vanderbilt (UP-2)
Ap Applewhite, Mississippi (UP-2)

Tackles
Curtis Luckey, Georgia (C, S, UP-2)
John Barnhill, Tennessee (C)
Mack Tharpe, Georgia Tech (C, UP-2, SWI)
Ox McKibbon, Vanderbilt (C)
Jess Tinsley, LSU (UP-2)

Guards
Fred Pickhard, Alabama (C, UP-1 [as t], S [as t], SWI [as t])
Charles Mackall, Virginia (C, S, SWI)
Claude Perry, Alabama (C, UP-1 [as t])
Orin "Mount" Helvey, Sewanee (C, UP-2 [as fb])
John Barnhill, Tennessee (UP-1)
Herman Salter, Auburn (UP-1)
Ellis Hagler, Alabama (S)
Ernest Rogers, Georgia (UP-2, SWI)

Centers
Gordon Holmes, Alabama (C, S)
Owen Poole, Georgia Tech (C, SWI)
Elvin Butcher, Tennessee (UP-1)
Vernon Sharpe, Vanderbilt (UP-2)

Quarterbacks
Bill Spears, Vanderbilt (College Football Hall of Fame) (C, UP-1, S, SWI [as hb])
Bill Rogers, South Carolina (C)

Halfbacks
George Morton, Georgia (C, UP-1, S, SWI)
Red Barnes, Alabama (C, UP-1, SWI [as qb])
Carter Barron, Georgia Tech (C, UP-2 [as qb])
Myron Stevens, Maryland (C)
Neil Cargile, Vanderbilt (UP-2)

Fullbacks
Ty Rauber, Washington & Lee (C, UP-1, S [as hb], SWI)
Tolbert Brown, Alabama (C)
Dick Dodson, Tennessee (S)

Key

See also
1926 College Football All-America Team

References

1926 Southern Conference football season
College Football All-Southern Teams